Ondřej Zvára (born 16 November 1983) is a Czech equestrian. He competed in the 2020 Summer Olympics.

References

1983 births
Living people
Equestrians at the 2020 Summer Olympics
Czech male equestrians
Olympic equestrians of the Czech Republic
Show jumping riders